Dorothy Bentinck, Duchess of Portland (née Lady Dorothy Cavendish; 27 August 17503 June 1794) was Duchess of Portland the as wife of William Cavendish-Bentinck, 3rd Duke of Portland, the Prime Minister of Great Britain. She was also a great-great-great-grandmother of Queen Elizabeth II through the queen's maternal grandmother.

Biography
Dorothy Cavendish was born on 27 August 1750 to William Cavendish, 4th Duke of Devonshire, the Prime Minister of Great Britain and his wife Lady Charlotte Boyle, 6th Baroness Clifford.

Marriage and children
On 8 November 1766, Cavendish was married to William Cavendish-Bentinck, 3rd Duke of Portland. They were parents of six children:
 William Bentinck, 4th Duke of Portland (24 June 176827 March 1854)
 The Right Hon. Lord Charles William Cavendish Bentinck (1 July 177024 July 1770)
 Unnamed son (25 August 1771died young)
 Lord William Henry Cavendish-Bentinck (14 September 177417 June 1839)
 Lady Charlotte Cavendish-Bentinck (3 October 177528 July 1862). Married Charles Greville, and they had three sons: Charles Cavendish Fulke Greville, Algernon Greville, and Henry William Greville (1801–1872), and a daughter, Harriet (1803–1870) m. Francis Egerton, 1st Earl of Ellesmere
 Lady Mary Cavendish-Bentinck (13 March 17786 November 1843)
 Lord Charles Bentinck (3 October 178028 April 1826). Paternal grandfather of Cecilia Bowes-Lyon, Countess of Strathmore and Kinghorne
 Lord Frederick Cavendish-Bentinck (2 November 178111 February 1828) married Mary Lowther (d. 1863), daughter of William Lowther, 16 September 1820; had issue: George Cavendish-Bentinck
 A stillborn baby, birthed at Burlington House on 20 October 1786.
According to newspaper accounts, she was the mother of nine children, only four of whom were living at the time of her own death.

Later life

The duchess died at her home, Burlington House, Piccadilly, and was buried in St Marylebone Parish Church, Marylebone, London. She “died of a bowel complaint, which she had been subject to for many years, and which terminated in a mortification after a short illness. It was at first suspected, from the violent inflammation in her bowels, that her Grace had eaten water-gruel out of a copper saucepan not properly tinned; but this suspicion is certainly erroneous, as it proved on examination.”

Bentinck was a great-great-great-grandmother of Queen Elizabeth II (see ancestry of Elizabeth II)

Ancestry

Arms

References

1750 births
1794 deaths
18th-century British people
18th-century British women
Dorothy
Dorothy
British duchesses by marriage
Spouses of prime ministers of the United Kingdom
Children of prime ministers of the United Kingdom
Daughters of English dukes
Daughters of barons
Burials at St Marylebone Parish Church
Deaths from digestive disease
Wives of knights